Lauren Parkes (Miss Black Delaware USA 2007 and Miss Maryland Galaxy 2008) was born on April 7, 1987 in Baltimore, Maryland

Background
Parkes-Springfield attended parochial schools in Baltimore County before entering the Institute of Notre Dame in Baltimore, Maryland. She was a member of the competition dance for all four years of her high school career. In addition she was a member of the Peer Ministry Club. During her senior year, she was honored as a Maryland Distinguished Scholar in academics and the art of dance. Lauren is a graduate of the University of Delaware where she received a Bachelor of Science in Fashion Merchandising. Parkes-Springfield also graduated with a Master of Arts in Professional and Business Communications from La Salle University. After relocating to Florida she earned her MBA from Florida Southern College. Lauren is currently married to Musician/Producer Brandon Springfield.

Parkes-Springfield still operates as a speaker, pageant coach and model. Lauren plans to compete for a Mrs. Title in the upcoming years.

Pageants
Since her entry into the pageantry arena, she has competed in such pageants as: Miss Maryland Teen USA 2004, Miss Maryland Teen Coed 2005 (4th Runner up), Miss Maryland USA 2007, Miss Black Delaware USA (Winner), Miss Delaware USA 2008 (Top 16), Miss Maryland Galaxy 2008 (Winner), and  Miss Earth Delaware 2011 (Winner). She has also won a variety of awards consisting of: Most Promising Model, Best Sportswear Model, Best Smile, Placement in the semi-finals, and two-time Best Interview honors. 

Parkes-Springfield is currently a resident of Florida and is actively involved with her community. Before relocating she was a Big Sister in the Big Brother Big Sister organization of Delaware and a volunteer cheerleading coach of a Junior Olympic Cheerleading team at the Boys and Girls Club of Newark, Delaware. Furthermore, she recently founded a non-profit organization entitled Project Wish List which enables disadvantaged families to have an incredible Christmas holiday.

During her reign as Miss Black Delaware USA, Parkes-Springfield deemed it important to teach youth that they can accomplish their dreams and stay true to themselves in the process of doing so. She stresses that it is essential that we show faith in our youth and as role models continuously strive to break down barriers whether they be gender, race, or age related. During this time she also campaigned for greater awareness of Black History Month, as well as increase funding for inner city schools within the greater city areas of Delaware.

In 2010 Parkes-Springfield placed in the Top 5 in the Miss Maryland USA competition. In 2011, Lauren placed 1st runner up to Miss Delaware USA 2012.

Official Website

1987 births
Living people
People from Baltimore